The 2004 Colorado Buffaloes football team represented the University of Colorado at Boulder in the 2004 NCAA Division I-A football season. The team played their home games in Folsom Field in Boulder, Colorado. They participated in the Big 12 Conference in the North Division. They were coached by head coach Gary Barnett.

Schedule

Personnel

Coaching staff
Head Coach: Gary Barnett
Assistants: Brian Cabral (AHC/ILB), Shawn Watson (OC/QB), Mike Hankwitz (DC/OLB), Dave Borbely (OL), Craig Bray (DB), Ted Gilmore (WR), Shawn Simms (RB), Chris Wilson (DL), John Wristen (TE)

Awards
All-Big 12: PK Mason Crosby (1st, AP/Coaches)
Big 12 Freshman of the Year (Defense): ILB Jordan Dizon
Big 12 Coach of the Year: Gary Barnett
Zack Jordan Award (Team MVP): TB Bobby Purify
John Mack Award (Outstanding Offensive Player): TB Bobby Purify
Dave Jones Award (Outstanding Defensive Player): DT Matt McChesney
Lee Willard Award (Outstanding Freshman): ILB Jordan Dizon
Dean Jacob Van Ek Award: PK J.T. Eberly
Derek Singleton Award: DT Matt McChesney
Bill McCartney Award: PK Mason Crosby

References

Colorado
Colorado Buffaloes football seasons
Houston Bowl champion seasons
Colorado Buffaloes football